Hussain Riyaz (born 4 December 1974) is a Maldivian sprinter. He competed in the men's 4 × 400 metres relay at the 1996 Summer Olympics.

References

External links
 

1974 births
Living people
Athletes (track and field) at the 1992 Summer Olympics
Athletes (track and field) at the 1996 Summer Olympics
Maldivian male sprinters
Maldivian male middle-distance runners
Olympic athletes of the Maldives
Place of birth missing (living people)